Velika Raven (locally , also Veliki Raven, Velika Ravan) is a former village in central Slovenia in the Municipality of Lukovica. It is now part of the village of Hribi. It is part of the traditional region of Upper Carniola and is now included in the Central Slovenia Statistical Region.

Geography
Velika Raven is a small high-elevation settlement on the western slope of Kamnec Hill, on the watershed between the Bolska and Motnišnica rivers. It lies northwest of the main hamlet in Hribi.

Name
Velika Raven is recorded in older sources in Slovene as Velika Rauna, Velke Ravne, Velka Ravan, and Velika Ravan, and in German as Welkaraun. The name literally means 'large flat area', referring to level terrain in hilly territory, from the common noun raven or ravan 'level area, plain', related to names such as Raven, Ravne, Ravnica, and Ravnace.

History
Velika Raven had a population of 29 (in four houses) in 1900, 22 (in three houses) in 1931, and 25 (in four houses) in 1953. Velika Raven was annexed by Hribi in 1953, ending its existence as a separate settlement.

References

External links
 
Velika Raven on Geopedia

Populated places in the Municipality of Lukovica
Former settlements in Slovenia